The "Branislav Nušić" Amateur Drama Theatre is one of the local theatres of Bosnia and Herzegovina, located in the city of Teslić.

History

The theatre was officially established on 16 February 2008. The theatre is the corner stone of the culture change as there are misconceptions that Teslić was a lifeless city with no culture due to the 1992–95 civil war. A group of citizens decided to revive their culture and improve their international image by delivering theatrical performances. They remembered street performer Marko Mudornja, active between 1958 and 1990.

While the founders were doing the final adjustments to the theatre, fifteen amateur actors were about to participate in their first show called The National Ambassador. The theatre was too small to accommodate the guests. That same year, they organized the first theatre caravan in Laktaši, with new performances and delivered awards to the performers.
In 2009, they began to organize acting classes for children from 7 to 14 years old who later become active performers in festivals all around the country.

References

External links
 Official website

Theatres in Bosnia and Herzegovina
Amateur theatre
Organizations based in Republika Srpska